Bieling is a surname. Notable people with the surname include:

Herman Bieling (1887–1964), Dutch painter, sculptor, and graphic artist
John Bieling (1869–1948), American tenor singer

See also
Bielin (disambiguation)